County Fermanagh was a UK Parliament constituency in Northern Ireland, returning two Members of Parliament.

Boundaries
This constituency comprised the whole of County Fermanagh, except for the Borough of Enniskillen.

Members of Parliament

Elections

Elections in the 1830s

 

 

 

Archdall resigned, causing a by-election.

Elections in the 1840s
Cole succeeded to the peerage, becoming 3rd Earl of Enniskillen and causing a by-election.

Elections in the 1850s

 

Brooke's death caused a by-election.

Elections in the 1860s

Elections in the 1870s

Elections in the 1880s

References

The Parliaments of England by Henry Stooks Smith (1st edition published in three volumes 1844–50), 2nd edition edited (in one volume) by F.W.S. Craig (Political Reference Publications 1973)

Westminster constituencies in County Fermanagh (historic)
Constituencies of the Parliament of the United Kingdom established in 1801
Constituencies of the Parliament of the United Kingdom disestablished in 1885